Furafylline is a methylxanthine derivative that was introduced in hope of being a long-acting replacement for theophylline in the treatment of asthma. It is an inhibitor of CYP1A2.

References

2-Furyl compounds
CYP1A2 inhibitors
Phosphodiesterase inhibitors
Xanthines